Bhaaga Pirivinai is a 1959 Indian Tamil-language drama film directed by A. Bhimsingh, starring Sivaji Ganesan, M. R. Radha and  B. Saroja Devi. The film was released on 31 October 1959. It was remade in Hindi as Khandan (1965), in Telugu as Kalasi Vunte Kaladu Sukham (1961), in Kannada as Muriyada Mane (1964), and in Malayalam as Nirakudam (1977).

Plot 
Vaidyalingam and Sundaralingam are brothers devoted to each other and married to Akilandam and Meenakshi respectively. While Vaidyalingam has no children of his own, Sundaralingam has Kannaiyan and Mani. While Kannaiyan had lost the use of his left hand due to an accident turns out to be uneducated; Mani turns out to be healthy, well-educated and almost the surrogate son of Akilandam, who hates the rest of Sundaralingam's family.

Enter Singapore Singaram, Akilandam's brother who is corrupt, cunning, evil, money-minded. He manipulates the situation such that Sundaralingam and Vaidyalingam are forced to partition their property (something considered the ultimate failure of joint families) while Kannaiyan and Mani are forced to separate as Mani is now married to Amudha, Singaram's daughter. Kannaiyan is married to Ponni. Singaram swindles off all the money from Akilandam and gets Mani into trouble in his office by stealing the company money.

In the end, Kannaiyan who comes to city to get treatment, accidentally gets electric shock and gets back the use of his hand, thrashes Singaram and reunites the family.

Cast 
Sivaji Ganesan as Kannaiyan
B. Sarojadevi as Ponni
M. N. Nambiar as Mani (Kannaiyan's brother)
M. R. Radha as Singapor Singaram
T. S. Balaiah as Vaithiyalingam Moopanar
S. V. Subbaiah as Sundaralingam Moopanar (Kannaiyan's father)
M. V. Rajamma as Meenakshi (Kannaiyan's mother)
C. K. Saraswathi as Akilandam (Vaithiyalingam's wife, Singarm's sister)
N. Lalitha as Amutha (Mani Lover)
K. M. Nambirajan
S. Ramarao
C. T. Rajakantham as Jaaldra Devi
 Padmini Priyadarshini as Annarkali

Production 
The film was produced by G. N. Velumani from Gobichettipalayam, who began life as a costume maker before rising to become a top Tamil producer. The film was shot at Neptune Studio (later Sathya Studio) in Adyar. G. Vittal Rao was the man behind the camera and Bhim Singh himself edited the film. Hari Babu and Gajapathi were in charge of make-up, while G. S. Mani, a musicologist, assisted in composing the music. The dances were choreographed by Madhavan, Chinnilal and Sampath.

Soundtrack 
The music was composed by Viswanathan–Ramamoorthy. Lyrics were by Kannadasan, A. Maruthakasi & Pattukkottai Kalyanasundaram. Viswanathan–Ramamoorthy used only three instruments for the song "Thazhayam Poo Mudichi".

Reception 
The Tamil magazine Ananda Vikatan appreciated the film stating "Sivaji's acting was fantastic in the role and the film totally fulfilled the expectations of everyone". At the 7th National Film Awards, the film won the President's silver medal for Best Feature Film in Tamil.

Remakes 
The film was remade in Hindi as Khandan (1965), in Telugu as Kalasi Vunte Kaladu Sukham (1961), in Kannada as Muriyada Mane (1964), and in Malayalam as Nirakudam (1977).

References

Bibliography

External links 

1950s Tamil-language films
1959 drama films
1959 films
Best Tamil Feature Film National Film Award winners
Films directed by A. Bhimsingh
Films scored by Viswanathan–Ramamoorthy
Indian drama films
Tamil films remade in other languages